Andrew John Holmes (born 7 January 1969) is an English former footballer who played in the Football League for Doncaster Rovers and Stoke City.

Career
Holmes was born in Stoke-on-Trent and played non-league football with Parkway Clayton before joining  Stoke City in 1985. He spent two seasons in the reserves and made his professional debut against Shrewsbury Town in 1987–88. He made just two more appearances that season and failed to make one in 1988–89 before he was given his chance in December 1989 due to injuries. He played in nine matches at centre back in 1989–90 but his inexperience lead to him being dropped for Noel Blake and due to Stoke's relegation he left for Fourth Division Doncaster Rovers. He played 13 times for Doncaster leaving the club after his place was taken by Jack Ashurst.

Career statistics
Source:

A.  The "Other" column constitutes appearances and goals in the Full Members Cup, Football League Trophy.

References

English footballers
Stoke City F.C. players
Doncaster Rovers F.C. players
English Football League players
1969 births
Living people
Newcastle Town F.C. players
Leek Town F.C. players
Association football defenders